Manogaran s/o Marimuthu (born 14 July 1959), commonly referred to as M. Manogaran is a Malaysian politician. He was the Member of Parliament for the constituency of Teluk Intan, Perak, for one term from 2008 to 2013, as a member of the Democratic Action Party (DAP) in the opposition Pakatan Rakyat (PR) coalition previously and governing Pakatan Harapan (PH) presently.

Manogaran is a lawyer by profession.

In the 2008 general election, Manogaran won the Parliamentary constituency of Teluk Intan, Perak on a DAP ticket. He ran against the incumbent, Mah Siew Keong, Deputy Minister of Agriculture & Agro-based Industries and Youth Chief of Parti Gerakan Rakyat Malaysia (Gerakan). He contested the parliamentary seat of Cameron Highlands, Pahang in the 2013 general election, and was defeated by government minister G. Palanivel who was the Malaysian Indian Congress (MIC) President then.

In the 2018 general election, he ran again for the Cameron Highlands seat but lost again in a five-corners contest this time to MIC Vice-President Sivarraajh Chandran by 597 votes majority. However the victory was nullified by the Election Court on 30 November 2018 after it allowed the election petition filed by Manogaran that corrupt practices were committed by Sivarraajh in the 14th general election. He was picked as the PH candidate to re-contest again in the four-cornered fight in 2019 Cameron Highlands by-election. But he lost again to Barisan Nasional (BN)'s indigenous Orang Asli direct candidate Ramli Mohd Nor in the by-election.

Controversies
On 3 April 2010, Manogaran was arrested for holding demonstration with activists at Batu Caves to protest the usage of "Interlok" novel which contained derogatory words to Malaysian Indians community in the syllabus for the Malay Literature subject as compulsory reading for students in Form 5 (Secondary 5) in schools throughout Malaysia.

On 9 January 2019 Manogaran as the PH candidate for the 2019 Cameron Highlands by-election had made insensitive remarks citing the perception that "Malays don't even buy kuih from Orang Asli vendors" analogy regarding BN fielding Orang Asli candidate causing him to apologise and express regrets for his action only a day later. On Polling Day, M. Manogaran, wore a shirt bearing party logo to a polling station against the election rules and he was asked to leave by the Election Commission (EC)’s officer.

Election results

Note: 1  The Election Court has on the 30 November 2018, nullified Sivarraajh's election for the element of corrupted practices and enabled 2019 Cameron Highlands by-election to be held. Sivarraajh was banned for five years.

References

Living people
1959 births
People from Penang
20th-century Malaysian lawyers
Malaysian politicians of Tamil descent
Malaysian politicians of Indian descent
Malaysian Hindus
Democratic Action Party (Malaysia) politicians
Members of the Dewan Rakyat
21st-century Malaysian politicians
21st-century Malaysian lawyers